East End Park Working Mens Club Football Club is a football club based in East End Park, Leeds, West Yorkshire, England. They are currently members of the 
.

History

The club won the Yorkshire Football League Division 2 title in 1958.

References

External links
Official website

Football clubs in England
Yorkshire Football League
West Yorkshire Association Football League